CEVA Logistics is a global logistics and supply chain company in both freight management and contract logistics with US$16 billion in revenues. Its head office is in Marseille, France, and it was founded in 2007, as a merger of TNT Logistics and EGL Eagle Global Logistics. In 2021, CEVA had 98,000 employees working in 6 Regions operating from 160 countries.

CEVA Logistics also announced plans for an IPO in April 2018. Credit Suisse and Morgan Stanley have already been appointed as bookrunners, with Deutsche Bank, UBS, Berenberg and HSBC working also working on the IPO. CEVA started trading on the SIX Swiss Exchange on 4 May 2018.

CEVA Logistics was acquired by CMA CGM Group, a French container transportation and shipping company. After the takeover, CMA CGM Group held 97.89% of the outstanding shares and voting rights of CEVA upon settlement of the tendered CEVA shares, with plans to delist CEVA from the Zurich Stock Exchanges.

In January 2020, Mathieu Friedberg was announced as the CEO of CEVA Logistics.

Midway through June 2020, CEVA Logistics is launching a three-part expansion plan for the African market.

In January 2022, CEVA became Scuderia Ferrari's official logistics partner, taking over from UPS after nine years.

In April 2022, CEVA Logistics confirmed the acquisitions of Ingram CLS, Colis Privé and GEFCO, making it one of the world largest 3PLs in both eCommerce and Automotive.

References

Apollo Global Management companies
Logistics companies of the Netherlands
Logistics companies of France
2019 mergers and acquisitions